Kamphaengphet Pittayakom School is a secondary school in Kamphaeng Phet, Thailand.

History 
The current school was created as a result of a merger of Watchararat Wittayalai and Kamphaengphet Women's
School Kamphaengphet on 14 September 1971. Kamphaengphet Pittayakom
as a large secondary school has been granted the Royal Award in 1995. The front of the school attaches to Phra Kaew Temple.
The north boundary is adjacent to the ancient palace. The south boundary is
adjacent to Kamphaengphet National Museum and the back is addicted to the wall
of the old city.

Facilities 
The school has six buildings such as the first building is
Chakungrao, the second building is Thungsetthi, the third building is Tri Truong,
the fourth building is Khonthi, the fifth building is Kosamphi, and the sixth
building is Nakhon Chum. At present, the school has 33.6 Acres and there are
approximately 1,750 students. Interesting activities within the school such as
sport within the school, teacher's annual ceremony, graduation ceremony and
others.

References

External links 
 

Schools in Thailand